Bimla Poddar is an Indian social worker, businessperson, philanthropist and the founder of Jnana Pravaha, a Varanasi based centre for cultural studies, engaged in the efforts to preserve the cultural heritage of India. Under the aegis of the organization, Poddar is involved in activities related to exploration of India's culture and maintains a heritage museum housing artifacts from ancient India. Born and brought up in Varanasi, in the Indian state of Uttar Pradesh, she was married into a rich business family to late Bimal Kumar Poddar and holds the directorship of many of the family concerns which includes Ambuja Cements. She was honoured by the Government of India in 2015 with Padma Shri, the fourth highest Indian civilian award.

See also
 Tarachand Ghanshyamdas
 Culture of India

References

Further reading
 

Recipients of the Padma Shri in other fields
Living people
Social workers
Scholars from Varanasi
Indian philanthropists
Indian industrialists
Year of birth missing (living people)
20th-century Indian educational theorists
Social workers from Uttar Pradesh
Women educators from Uttar Pradesh
Educators from Uttar Pradesh
20th-century Indian women scientists
20th-century Indian businesspeople
Businesswomen from Uttar Pradesh
Businesspeople from Varanasi
20th-century Indian businesswomen
20th-century women educators